Daniel Nash Morgan (August 18, 1844 – May 30, 1931) was a United States banker who was Treasurer of the United States from 1893 to 1897.

Biography
Daniel N. Morgan was born in Newtown, Connecticut on August 18, 1844. His father owned a store, which he took over as a young man. He later took a partner, running the store as Morgan & Booth. In 1869, he moved to Bridgeport, Connecticut, becoming a partner in Birdsey & Morgan, a firm producing dry goods and carpets. He also ran a grocery, Morgan, Hopson & Co., in 1877. In 1879, he became president of the City National Bank of Bridgeport.

Morgan was elected to the Bridgeport common council in 1873 and served until 1874. He was a member of the Bridgeport Board of Education from 1877 to 1878 and was mayor of Bridgeport in 1880 and 1884.

In 1893, President Grover Cleveland named Morgan Treasurer of the United States and Morgan held that office from June 1, 1893, until June 30, 1897.

He married a descendant of William Judson of Stratford, Connecticut. The Morgans had a son, William Judson Morgan, and a daughter, May Huntington Morgan.

Morgan was a candidate for governor of Connecticut in 1898, but lost to George E. Lounsbury.

Morgan died in Bridgeport on May 30, 1931, 12 days after being hit by an automobile. He is buried in Mountain Grove Cemetery, Bridgeport.

References

1844 births
1931 deaths
Treasurers of the United States
People from Newtown, Connecticut
Politicians from Bridgeport, Connecticut
Burials at Mountain Grove Cemetery, Bridgeport
Road incident deaths in Connecticut